Atula Maha Dhamma Dewi was the chief queen consort of King Uzana I of Pinya. Uzana I was her half-brother. She was a paternal aunt of King Swa Saw Ke of Ava.

Ancestry
The following is her ancestry as reported by the Hmannan Yazawin chronicle. Her personal name was Saw Min Ya (စောမင်းရာ).

References

Bibliography
 

Pagan dynasty
Queens consort of Pinya
13th-century Burmese women
14th-century Burmese women